Będzin is a town in Silesian Voivodeship (S Poland).

Będzin may also refer to:

Będzin, Lower Silesian Voivodeship (south-west Poland)
Będzin, West Pomeranian Voivodeship (north-west Poland)